Two explosions targeting tourists in Yemen took place in mid-March 2009. Sixteen South Korean tourists were in Shibam, Yemen, at the time of the first blast. Four Korean tourists alongside their local Yemeni guide were killed in the first attack on 15 March, while three more tourists were injured. Relatives of the victims were involved in the second blast on 18 March but the only fatality was the bomber. The initial attack followed numerous calls by members of the Al-Qaeda military network to attack visitors in the region.

15 March attack 
The 15 March blast took place when a series of tourists were posing for photographs on a hill overlooking Shibam. Five were killed and three were injured.

18 March attack 
The 18 March attack took place when a convoy of South Korean investigators and the relatives of the victims of the previous attack were journeying from their Sana'a hotel to an airport. A young man walked between two cars and detonated his explosive vest, killing himself. According to AFP, Yemeni security officials stated that they had found a fragment of the bomber's identity card. The fragment revealed his address and showed that he was a 20-year-old student.

See also 
List of terrorist incidents, 2009
2007 South Korean hostage crisis in Afghanistan

References 

2009 murders in Yemen
Attacks in Asia in 2009
Suicide bombings in Yemen
Mass murder in 2009
Terrorist incidents attributed to al-Qaeda in the Arabian Peninsula
Terrorist incidents in Yemen in 2009
Anti-South Korean sentiment
Attacks on tourists in Asia
South Korea–Yemen relations
March 2009 crimes
Attacks in Yemen